St. John Vianney High School may refer to one of several high schools in the United States:

St. John Vianney High School (Kirkwood, Missouri) in Kirkwood, Missouri
St. John Vianney High School (New Jersey) in Holmdel Township, New Jersey
St. John Vianney High School (Los Angeles) in Los Angeles, California